The White–Fox House Archeological Site is a historic site in New Smyrna Beach, Florida, United States. It was added to the U.S. National Register of Historic Places on July 10, 2008.

This property is part of the Archeological Resources of the 18th-Century Smyrnea Settlement of Dr. Andrew Turnbull Multiple Property Submission, a Multiple Property Submission to the National Register.

References

Archaeological sites in Florida
Houses on the National Register of Historic Places in Volusia County, Florida
Buildings and structures in New Smyrna Beach, Florida